Boven Saramacca is a resort in Suriname, located in the Sipaliwini District.  Its population at the 2012 census was 1,427. The dominant geographical feature of this resort is the Saramacca River. The resort is mainly inhabited by Maroons of the Matawai tribe.

The main village is Nieuw Jacobkondre which can be reached via an unpaved which connects to the Southern East-West Link and from there to the rest of the country.  The Njoeng Jacob Kondre Airstrip also serves Nieuw Jacobkondre. Poesoegroenoe is home to the granman of the Matawai.

Other villages
 Boslanti
 Heidoti
 Kwattahede
 Makajapingo
 Moetoetoetabriki
 Pakka-Pakka
 Tabrikiekondre
 Villa Brazil
 Warnakomoponafaja

References

Resorts of Suriname
Populated places in Sipaliwini District